The Texas Rangers are an American baseball franchise based in Arlington, Texas. They are members of the American League West division. The Rangers franchise was formed in 1961, then called the Washington Senators, as a member of the American League. In its 62-year history, the Texas Rangers baseball franchise of Major League Baseball's American League has employed 28 managers. The duties of the team manager include team strategy and leadership on and off the field.

Mickey Vernon became the first manager of the then Washington Senators in 1961, serving for just over two seasons. Ron Washington has managed more games and seasons than any other manager in Rangers history. Before 2010, the only Rangers manager to have led the team to the playoffs was Johnny Oates, who also won the 1996 Manager of the Year Award with the Rangers. Ted Williams is the only Rangers manager to have been inducted into the Baseball Hall of Fame as a player; Whitey Herzog, who was inducted in the Hall in 2010, is only Rangers manager to earn induction as a manager.

In 1963, manager Mickey Vernon was fired and replaced by interim manager Eddie Yost. One game later, Yost was replaced by Gil Hodges. In 1973, Whitey Herzog was replaced by Del Wilber. One game later, Billy Martin took over the role of manager. In 1975, Frank Lucchesi took over for Martin in midseason, who in turn was replaced by Eddie Stanky. After six games, Connie Ryan could not finish the season, so Billy Hunter took over the role of manager, only to be fired with one game to go in the 1978 season and replaced by Pat Corrales. In 1982, Don Zimmer was fired as Rangers manager but continued to run the team for three more games before being replaced by Darrell Johnson. Rangers owner Eddie Chiles said the poor play of the Rangers had nothing to do with Zimmer's firing but was instead 'something personal'. In 1985, after Doug Rader led the Rangers to two losing seasons, he was replaced by Bobby Valentine, who in turn was replaced by Toby Harrah during midseason. In 2001, Johnny Oates' poor performance forced the Rangers to hire Jerry Narron as his midseason replacement. Buck Showalter was hired as manager of the Texas Rangers following a last-place 2002 season under Narron. Showalter managed the Rangers through the 2006 season. Ron Washington next managed the team from 2007 to 2014, longer than any other person in the franchise's history, when he announced his resignation on September 5, 2014. Tim Bogar managed the rest of the season on an interim basis. Jeff Banister was hired to lead the team from 2015 to September 21, 2018, when he was fired. Don Wakamatsu replaced him as interim manager. Chris Woodward was later hired as the new manager for 2019. He was dismissed on August 15, 2022, and replaced by third base coach Tony Beasley.

Key

Managers

		

Statistics current through the end of the 2022 season

References
In-text citations

General references

 
Texas Rangers
managers